The 2011 Cork Junior A Football Championship was the 113th staging of the Cork Junior A Football Championship since its establishment by the Cork County Board. The draw for the opening fixtures took place on 11 December 2010. The championship ran from 24 September to 11 November 2011.

The final was played on 11 November 2010 at Páirc Uí Rinn in Cork, between Kanturk and Mitchelstown, in what was their first ever meeting in the final. Kanturk won the match by 1-20 to 0-04 to claim their first ever championship title.

Kanturk's Donagh Duane was the championship's top scorer with 0-18.

Qualification

Results

Quarter-finals

Semi-finals

Final

Championship statistics

Top scorers

Top scorers overall

Top scorers in a single game

References

2011 in Irish sport
Cork Junior Football Championship